Extreme Makeover is an American reality television series that premiered on ABC on December 11, 2002. Created by television producer Howard Schultz, the show depicts ordinary men and women undergoing "extreme makeovers" involving plastic surgery, exercise regimens, hairdressing, and wardrobing. Each episode ends with the participants' return to their families and friends, who have not been allowed to see the incremental changes during the participants' absence, and showing their reactions.

On May 15, 2007, Extreme Makeover was officially cancelled. The show's final three episodes were broadcast on Mondays starting July 2, 2007.

A spin-off series, Extreme Makeover: Home Edition, debuted in 2003. The Home Edition ended up becoming far more successful than its parent series and would go on to outlast the latter's run. Another spin-off, Extreme Makeover: Weight Loss Edition, premiered in ABC's 2011 summer season. Eventually, the show excised its connection to the franchise and was retitled Extreme Weight Loss in 2013.

Episodes

Season 1 (2002-2003)

Season 2 (2003-2004)

Nielsen ratings

Controversy

Some have criticized Extreme Makeover for reinforcing unachievable body image goals among both women and men. It is believed by critics that the show implies that idealized beauty can only be found through the aid of cosmetic surgeons, placing ‘beauty’ as a relatively unachievable goal for most people. As most do not have the funds to afford cosmetic surgery, their only other means of coming close to attaining ‘beauty’ is through extreme dieting and exercise, which then has the potential of creating eating disorders, as well as exercise disorders. Furthermore, critics believe that the show exemplifies and emphasizes the importance society places on physical appearance, as opposed to thoughts or beliefs. According to critical analysis, the show places far too much importance on how a person presents themselves to society, as opposed to what they contribute to it. Alternately, others, although remaining critical of the show's overall message, acknowledge that there can be some empowerment that comes from achieving a certain set of ‘beauty’ goals. Comparisons have been drawn to how some women claim a sense of empowerment from finding themselves the object of male desire, either in general social settings or through their given profession–for example, in the pornography industry.

The issue can more or less be condensed down into examining why and how this certain set of desirable physical attributes has become the pinnacle of physical appeal. With the case of Extreme Makeover, it is understood that the show producers are not establishing these standards of desired beauty, but instead profiting from them, as well as perpetuating them. It is the further perpetuation of these difficult to achieve, and debatably unhealthy beauty standards that have given rise to the critical assessment of Extreme Makeover, as well as other shows like it.

Deleese McGee lawsuit
Extreme Makeover faced controversy after contestant Deleese McGee's makeover was canceled. McGee applied as a contestant on the show and both she and her family were interviewed for an episode in January 2004. When asked questions about Deleese, her family initially responded only with positive comments, though producers repeatedly encouraged them to say negative things about her appearance; the intention was to compare the negative comments to their reaction after Deleese's surgery was complete. Deleese was in the next room listening; her shock at hearing the comments was filmed as part of the intended episode. The night before the surgery, however, Deleese was informed the procedures had been canceled on the grounds that her estimated recovery time did not fit with the filming schedule. After the surgery was canceled Deleese's sister Kellie suffered from guilt for making the negative comments; she died from an intentional drug overdose in May 2004. Deleese sued for emotional damages; the case was settled out of court. The controversy is credited as a contributing factor in the show's cancellation.

References

External links
 

 
American Broadcasting Company original programming
2000s American reality television series
2002 American television series debuts
2007 American television series endings
Fashion-themed reality television series
Makeover reality television series
Television series about plastic surgery
Television series by Disney–ABC Domestic Television
English-language television shows